Mason County is a county located in the U.S. state of Kentucky. As of the 2020 census, the population was 17,120.  Its county seat is Maysville. The county was created from Bourbon County, Virginia in 1788 and named for George Mason, a Virginia delegate to the U.S. Constitutional Convention known as the "Father of the Bill of Rights".
Mason County comprises the Maysville, KY Micropolitan Statistical Area, which is included in the Cincinnati-Wilmington-Maysville, OH-KY-IN Combined Statistical Area.

Geography
The county's northern border with Ohio is formed by the Ohio River.

Adjacent counties
 Brown County, Ohio  (north)
 Adams County, Ohio  (northeast)
 Lewis County  (east)
 Fleming County  (south)
 Robertson County  (southwest)
 Bracken County  (west)

Demographics

As of the census of 2000, there were 16,800 people, 6,847 households, and 4,697 families residing in the county. The racial makeup of the county was 90.88% White, 7.16% Black or African American, 0.15% Native American, 0.37% Asian, 0.02% Pacific Islander, 0.57% from other races, and 0.85% from two or more races.  0.95% of the population were Hispanic or Latino of any race.

There were 6,847 households, out of which 31.30% had children under the age of 18 living with them, 54.20% were married couples living together, 11.10% had a female householder with no husband present, and 31.40% were non-families. 27.60% of all households were made up of individuals, and 12.80% had someone living alone who was 65 years of age or older.  The average household size was 2.41 and the average family size was 2.92.

In the county, the population was spread out, with 24.10% under the age of 18, 8.00% from 18 to 24, 28.50% from 25 to 44, 23.90% from 45 to 64, and 15.50% who were 65 years of age or older.  The median age was 38 years. For every 100 females, there were 93.70 males.  For every 100 females age 18 and over, there were 89.50 males.

The median income for a household in the county was $30,195, and the median income for a family was $37,257. Males had a median income of $30,718 versus $21,216 for females. The per capita income for the county was $16,589.  About 12.90% of families and 16.80% of the population were below the poverty line, including 23.60% of those under age 18 and 13.70% of those age 65 or over.

Communities

Cities
 Dover
 Germantown
 Maysville
 Sardis

Census-designated place
 Mays Lick

Other unincorporated places

 Fernleaf
 Helena
 Lewisburg
 Minerva
 Orangeburg
 Shannon
 Somo
 Weedonia

Politics
Mason County was at the time of the Civil War the easternmost of the strongly secessionist Bluegrass bloc. Mason was in fact the most easterly Kentucky county to be represented at the Russellville Convention of 1861 to discuss the secession of Kentucky from the Union.

Mason County's secessionist sentiment meant that it voted Democratic consistently up until the 1950s, with the exception of the 1928 election when strong local anti-Catholic sentiment against Al Smith allowed Herbert Hoover to carry the county. Since 1996 the county has shifted more strongly Republican in US presidential elections.

Education
Mason County Schools operates public schools.

Schools:
 Mason County High School
 Mason County Middle School
 Mason County Intermediate School
 Straub Elementary School

In 1990 the Maysville Independent School District merged into the Mason County school district.

Notable residents
 Joshua Bean, first Mayor of San Diego (1850-1851).
 Albert Sidney Johnston, Commander of the Army of the Republic of Texas, Secretary of War for Texas, Commander of the Western Department for the Confederacy. Died at the Battle of Shiloh.
 Judge Roy Bean, Famous "Hanging Judge" of Texas (Law West of the Pecos). 
 Deron Feldhaus, member of "The Unforgettables".
 Chris Lofton, Played basketball for the University of Tennessee. 2003 Ky. "Mr. Basketball".
 Darius Miller, Played basketball for University of Kentucky. 2012 NCAA Champion, 2008 Ky. "Mr. Basketball." Currently plays basketball for the New Orleans Pelicans.

See also

 National Register of Historic Places listings in Mason County, Kentucky

References

External links
 Mason County government's website
 Historical Texts and Images of Mason County
 Mason County school district's website

 
Kentucky counties
Kentucky counties on the Ohio River
Maysville, Kentucky micropolitan area
1788 establishments in Virginia
Populated places established in 1788
Former counties of Virginia